Clongowes Wood College SJ is a voluntary boarding school for boys near Clane, County Kildare, Ireland, founded by the Jesuits in 1814, which features prominently in James Joyce's semi-autobiographical novel A Portrait of the Artist as a Young Man. One of five Jesuit schools in Ireland, it had 450 students in 2019.

The school's current headmaster, Christopher Lumb, is the first lay headmaster in its history.

School
The school is a secondary boarding school for boys from Ireland and other parts of the world. The school is divided into three groups, known as "lines". The Third Line is for first and second year students, the Lower Line for third and fourth years, and the Higher Line for fifth and sixth years. Each year is known by a name, drawn from the Jesuit Ratio Studiorum: Elements (first year), Rudiments (second), Grammar (third), Syntax (fourth), Poetry (fifth), and Rhetoric (sixth).

Buildings
The medieval castle was originally built in the 13th century by Stuart Cullen, an early Anglo-Norman warrior and landowner in northern Kildare. He had been given extensive lands in the area of Kill, Celbridge, and Mainham by his brother, Rurai Blaney, who had come to Ireland with Strongbow, the Earl of Pembroke.

The castle is the residence of the religious community and was improved by a "chocolate box" type restoration in the 18th century. It was rebuilt in 1718 by Stephen Fitzwilliam Browne and extended in 1788 by Thomas Wogan Browne. It is situated beside a ditch and wall—known as ramparts—constructed for the defence of the Pale in the 14th century. The building was completely refurbished in 2004 and the reception area was moved back there from the "1999 building."

The castle is connected to the modern buildings by an elevated corridor hung with portraits, the Serpentine Gallery referred to by James Joyce. This gallery was completely demolished and rebuilt in 2004 as part of a redevelopment programme for the school buildings.

In 1929 another wing was built at a cost of £135,000, presenting the rear façade of the school. It houses the main classrooms and the Elements, Rudiments, Grammar and Syntax dormitories.

An expansion and modernisation was completed in 2000; the €4.8m project added another residential wing that included a 500-seat dining hall, kitchen, entrance hall, offices, and study/bedrooms for sixth year ("Rhetoric") students.

The Boys' Chapel has an elaborate reredos, a large pipe organ in the gallery, and a sequence of Stations of the Cross painted by Sean Keating. School tradition has it that the portrait of Pontius Pilate in the 12th station was based on the school rector, who had refused to pay the artist his asking price.

The moat that outlines the nearby forest of the college is the old border of The Pale, with the Wogan-Browne castle (now the residence of the Jesuit community) landmarking its edge.

History
The school traces its history back to a  estate owned by the Wogan family in 1418 under the reign of Henry IV. The name "Clongowes" comes from the Irish for "meadow" (cluain) and for "blacksmith" (gobha). The estate was originally known as "Clongowes de Silva" (de Silva meaning "of the wood" in Latin). The estate later passed to the Eustace family and became part of the fortified border of the Pale in 1494. The Eustaces lost their estates during the Restoration (1660).  The estate was sold by the Wogan-Brownes to the Jesuits in March 1814 for £16,000.

The school accepted its first pupil, James McLornan, on 18 May 1814.

In 1886 the Jesuit-run St Stanislaus College in Tullabeg, County Offaly, was amalgamated with Clongowes Wood College.

Joseph Dargan served as rector in the 1970s.
Leonard Moloney was the headmaster from 2004 to 2015. Michael Sheil retired as rector in 2006 and Bruce Bradley (headmaster 1992–2000) was his successor. In September 2011 Michael Sheil returned as rector.

As of 2021, there are four Jesuits living at the school. Two priests and two brothers.

Clongowes is also part of an initiative to ease religious tensions in Turkey, currently being headed by Alan McGuckian (former teacher in Clongowes now Bishop of Raphoe) in Istanbul.

Prefect of Studies/Headmaster
 Francis Mahony
 John Conmee (1883-1887)
 James Daly (1887-1916)
 Larry Kieran (1917-1925)
 Mathias Bodkin (1933-1937)
 Brian McMahon (1944-1947)
 Hilary Lawton (1948-1959)
 Raymond J Lawler (1959-1962)
 Joseph Marmion (1962-1965)
 Paddy Crowe (1971–1976)
 Philip Fogarty (July 1976 – Aug 1987)
 Liam O'Connell (1987-1992)
 Bruce Bradley (1992-2000)
 Dermot Murray (2000–2004)
 Leonard Moloney (2004–2015)
 Chris Lumb (2015–present) – first lay headmaster

Rectors
 Peter Kenney (1814–1817) – founder of the college
 Charles Aylmer (1817–1820) – took out lease of land for Tullabeg College
 Peter Kenney (1821–1830)
 Bartholomew Esmonde (1829–1836)
 Robert Haly (1836–1841) and (1842–1850) 
 Michael A Kavanagh (1850–1855)
 Robert Carbery (1870-1876)
 John Conmee (1885-1891)
 Matthew Devitt (1891-1900)
 Matthew Devitt (1907-)
 Charles Mulcahy (1919–1921)
 George Redington Roche (1927-1933)
 Hilary Lawton (1959-1965)
 Frank Joy (1965-1968)
 Paddy Crowe (1968–71 and 1992–95)
 Jack Brennan
 Joseph Dargan (1977–1979)
 Paddy Carberry (1980–1983)
 Kieran Hanley (1983–)
 Dermot Murray (1995–2000)
 Michael Sheil (2000–2006) 
 Bruce Bradley (2006–2011)
 Michael Sheil (2011–present)

Historical accounts
One early history of the school is The Clongowes Record 1814–1932 by Timothy Corcoran (Browne and Nolan, Dublin, 1932). A half-century later, a history was written by Roland Burke Savage and published in The Clongownian school magazine during the 1980s; that same decade, Peter Costello wrote Clongowes Wood: a History of Clongowes Wood College 1814–1989, published by Gill and Macmillan, Dublin, 1989).

Sport
Clongowes is known for its strong pedigree in rugby union. Despite a relatively small size, Clongowes has won the Leinster Schools Rugby Senior Cup on nine occasions, winning its first final in 1926. Following this, there was a gap of 52 years until the next title in 1978. Beginning with a 3rd title in 1988 and up until 2011, Clongowes has appeared in 13 finals, more than any other school in the competition during this period. Clongowes secured a first set of back-to-back titles with wins in 2010 and 2011 before being awarded a joint title in the 2020 season which was cut short because of the COVID-19 pandemic.

Cultural associations
The school featured prominently in James Joyce's semi-autobiographical novel A Portrait of the Artist as a Young Man. A documentary depicting a year in the life in the school was screened in 2001 as part of RTÉ's True Lives series. The popular fictional series of Ross O'Carroll Kelly has mentioned Clongowes Wood on a number of occasions in the book and Irish Times column.

Selected notable past pupils

Arts and media
Maurice Healy (writer), author of the celebrated memoir The Old Munster Circuit
Nick Hewer, public relations guru and features on popular shows such as Countdown and The Apprentice.
Aidan Higgins, writer
James Joyce, writer
Francis Sylvester Mahony, 19th-century humorist known by the pen name "Father Prout"
Paul McGuinness, former business manager for the Irish rock band U2
David McSavage, comedian, writer and producer of The Savage Eye
Charles Mitchel, RTÉ's first newsreader
Micheal O'Siadhail, Irish poet
Kieran Prendiville, television writer, producer, and creator of the BBC drama Ballykissangel
John Ryan, artist, broadcaster, publisher, critic, editor, patron and publican
Sydney Bernard Smith, poet, author, actor, and dramatist
Patrick James Smyth,  journalist
J. T. Walsh, US film actor

Law
Sir Donnell Deeny, judge in the High Court of Northern Ireland, Pro-Chancellor of the University of Dublin
Nial Fennelly, judge of the Supreme Court of Ireland, former Advocate General of the European Court of Justice
Thomas Finlay, former Irish Fine Gael politician and Chief Justice of the Supreme Court of Ireland
James FitzGerald-Kenney, Irish politician, former Minister for Justice
Raymond Groarke. President of the Circuit Court
Alan Mahon, judge of the Court of Appeal (Ireland)
James Patrick Mahon, known as the O'Gorman Mahon, journalist, barrister, parliamentarian 
Sir Richard Martin, High Sheriff of Dublin (1866)
Niall McCarthy (judge), Justice of the Supreme Court of Ireland
Tom O'Higgins, former Chief Justice of Ireland, former Minister for Health, Judge of the European Court of Justice
Daniel O'Keeffe, chairperson of the Standards in Public Office Commission, former judge of the High Court
Christopher Palles, the most eminent Irish judge of his time
SirJohn Joseph Sheil PC, Lord Justice of Appeal in Northern Ireland
James John Skinner, first Minister of Justice of the Republic of Zambia and former Chief Justice of Malawi

Politics and diplomacy
Frederick Boland, first Irish ambassador to the United Kingdom and to the United Nations, Chancellor of the University of Dublin
John Bruton, former Taoiseach of Ireland
Richard Bruton, Minister for Jobs, Enterprise and Innovation
Simon Coveney, Former Tánaiste, Current Irish Minister for Foreign Affairs 
Edmund Dwyer-Gray, 29th Premier of Tasmania
Andrew Kettle, Irish nationalist politician and founder member of the Irish Land League
Thomas Kettle, Irish  journalist, barrister, writer, poet, soldier, economist and Home Rule politician
Sir Gilbert Laithwaite, former British ambassador to Ireland and High Commissioner to Pakistan
Patrick Little, Irish Fianna Fáil politician and Government Minister, most notably as the country's longest-serving Minister for Posts & Telegraphs
Enoch Louis Lowe, 33rd Governor of the US state of Maryland
Patrick McGilligan, former Irish Minister for Industry and Commerce
Thomas Francis Meagher, Irish nationalist and leader of the Young Irelanders
Purcell O'Gorman, soldier and Home Rule League politician
Kevin O'Higgins, former Irish Vice-president of the Executive Council and Minister for Justice
Michael O'Higgins, former Fine Gael TD and leader of the Seanad
Donogh O'Malley, former Irish Minister for Health and Minister for Education
James O'Mara, nationalist leader and key member of the First Dáil
The O'Rahilly, Irish Volunteer, killed in the Easter Rising
John M. O'Sullivan, Cumann na nGaedheal politician, cabinet minister and academic
Cornelius James Pelly, Irish diplomat
John Redmond, Irish nationalist politician, barrister, MP in the House of Commons  of the United Kingdom of Great Britain and Ireland and leader of the Irish Parliamentary Party from 1900 to 1918

Military
Francis Clery,  British Army General who commanded 2nd Division during the Second Boer War
Eugene Esmonde, Second World War pilot and posthumous recipient of the Victoria Cross
Aidan MacCarthy, Air Commodore RAF, Doctor, author of 'A Doctor's War'
Pat Reid, British Army officer who escaped from Colditz and noted nonfiction and historical author

Religion
James Corboy SJ, First Roman Catholic Bishop of Monze, Zambia (1962-1992), Rector of Milltown (1959-1962)
Joseph Dalton, Jesuit who founded a number of schools and churches in Australia
John Charles McQuaid, Catholic  Archbishop of Dublin and Primate of Ireland between 1940 and 1972
The O'Conor Don, Charles O'Conor
Patrick Finbar Ryan, O.P., (1881-1975), Dominican priest, served as Archbishop of Port of Spain, Trinidad (1940–1966)

Science and medicine
Francis Cruise (surgeon), Irish surgeon and urologist best known for inventing an endoscope
Daniel Joseph Kelly O'Connell, SJ, Jesuit, astronomer and seismologist, Director of Riverview and the Vatican Observatory, president of the Pontifical Academy of Sciences(1968-72), the O'Connell effect named after him.
Oliver St John Gogarty, surgeon, writer, critic, and inspiration for Buck Mulligan in James Joyce's Ulysses
James Bayley Butler - Academic biologist and Zoologist

Business
Aidan Heavey, CEO of Tullow Oil
Barry O'Callaghan, chairman and CEO of Houghton Mifflin Harcourt, and the Chairman of Education Media & Publishing Group
Michael O'Leary, CEO of Ryanair
Tony O'Reilly, Junior, Irish businessman
Michael Smurfit, Businessman, former CEO of Jefferson Smurfit Group

Sports
Tadhg Beirne, Irish rugby union international, British & Irish Lion #838, Munster rugby player
Brian Carney, Irish rugby league player
Will Connors, Irish rugby union international, Leinster Rugby Player and former Ireland sevens player
Thomas Crean, Irish rugby union player, British & Irish Lion #53, British Army soldier and doctor, Awarded the V.C.
Gordon D'Arcy, Irish rugby union international, British & Irish Lion #720, Leinster rugby player
Ted Durcan, Champion Flat Jockey, Winner of multiple global classic races
Paddy Hopkirk, International Rally driver, winner of Monte Carlo Rally
David Kearney, Irish rugby union international, Leinster rugby player
Rob Kearney, Irish rugby union international, British & Irish Lion #766, Leinster rugby player
James Magee, Irish cricketer and rugby union player, British & Irish Lion #56
Fergus McFadden, Irish rugby union international, Leinster rugby player.
 Max McFarland, Scotland rugby sevens international
Noel Purcell, Irish rugby union player, Irish & GB water polo Olympian, the first man to have represented two countries at the Olympics
Patrick Quinlan, Australian cricketer and lawyer
Arthur Robinson, Irish first-class cricketer

Partner schools
Aloisiuskolleg, Jesuit boarding school in Bonn-Bad Godesberg, Germany
Collegium Augustinianum Gaesdonck, boarding school in Goch, Germany
Enniskillen Royal Grammar School, voluntary grammar school in Enniskillen, Co. Fermanagh
Kolleg St. Blasien, Jesuit boarding school in St. Blasien, Germany
Saint Ignatius' College, Riverview, Jesuit boarding school in Sydney, Australia
Passy-Buzenval, Catholic private school, Paris, France
St Joseph's College, Hunters Hill, Marist Brothers boarding school in Sydney, Australia
St Aloysius' College (Sydney), Jesuit Day School in Sydney, Australia

See also
 List of Jesuit schools
 List of Jesuit sites in Ireland
 List of alumni of Jesuit educational institutions
 Our Lady's Children's Hospital, Crumlin

References

External links
Clongowes Wood College website
Clongowes Youth Club

1814 establishments in Ireland
Educational institutions established in 1814
Secondary schools in County Kildare
Boys' schools in the Republic of Ireland
Private schools in the Republic of Ireland
Jesuit secondary schools in Ireland
Catholic boarding schools in Ireland
Clane